The second season of Internet Icon premiered on May 21, 2013 and concluded on July 27, 2013 on the YOMYOMF YouTube channel. Ryan Higa and Christine Lakin both returned as judges, and Timothy DeLaGhetto joined the judging panel for this season. Chester See did not return as host; Chris Riedell took over the role, with his brother Nick Riedell joining as mentor for the contestants. Collectively, the two are known as the Brothers Riedell, winners of the first season.

Like the previous season, there were many guest judges joining Higa, Lakin and DeLaGhetto, including Smosh, Jenna Marbles, Kassem G, Ben and Rafi Fine, Philip DeFranco, Shane Dawson and PewDiePie.

Matthew Fredrick, also known as Matthias from Los Angeles, California, won the competition, beating the runners-up Bad Weather Films and the Kloons. As the winner, he won $10,000 in cash, a MacBook Pro, a one-year development deal with YOMYOMF, and a meeting with a Hollywood film director.

Overview
The second season of Internet Icon saw the runtime of each partial episode jump to half an hour. During the preliminary round that featured judges Ryan Higa, Christine Lakin, and a new judge, Tim Chantarangsu (better known as Timothy DeLaGhetto), deliberating to reach their top 10 out 100 contestants, their judgement focused on highlighting the high points of each submission video.  The Brothers Riedell, winners of season 1, also joined the series as the host (Chris Riedell), and mentor (Nick Riedell).

Some of the top 10 contestants created recap videos during the release of the season's episodes. These contestants included Will Pacarro, Bad Weather Films, and The Kloons.

Truth Integration
Truth Orange is a sponsor of Internet Icon. During the broadcast of the season, Truth Orange set up a feature where viewers were able to log on and vote for their favorite contestants (excluding the top three). Will Pacarro was announced as the winner of the Fan Favorite poll during the season finale, and has a guaranteed position in the top ten of season three. Truth Orange also based an entire challenge around "ugly truths". During the Murder Mystery Challenge, the contestants had to include the fact of urea being found in urine and cigarette smoke, and that sodium hydroxide is found in hair removal products.

Top 10 Finalists

Contestants

 Anthony Ma was eliminated in the first challenge.
 Stellar Lense Productions, consisting of Orlando Gomez, Phillip Bergman, Michael Bauer and Lisa Talley, were eliminated in the second challenge.
 Elishama "Shama" Mrema, better known as Shama Llama, was eliminated in the third challenge, after being in both the top three and the bottom three in the first and second challenges, respectively.
 Tristan Shields and Rory Shields, collectively known as the Shields Brothers, were eliminated in the fourth challenge.
 Megan Batoon, the final female contestant on the show and the only singular female contestant of the top 10, was eliminated in the fifth challenge.
 Alex Goyette, better known as Joule Thief, was controversially eliminated in the sixth challenge, after winning the second challenge. He was the first contestant to be eliminated that had previously won a challenge of the season.
 Will Pacarro was twice in the bottom two of the contestants, in the third and sixth challenges, and was the only contestant in the top four to not have been in the top two of a challenge. Pacarro was eliminated in the seventh challenge.
 Peter Vass and Sam Milman, better known collectively as Bad Weather Films, won the fifth challenge of the second season, and was also in the bottom two of the fourth challenge.
 Mitch Lewis, Greg Washburn and Nik Kazoura, better known collectively as The Kloons, won the first, third and sixth challenges of the second season, which is the most of all of the contestants in the season.
 Matthew Fredrick, known as Matthias, was initially in the bottom two in the first challenge, but later went on to win the fourth challenge of the season. Matthias was ultimately crowned the winner of the second season in the finale on 27 July 2013.

Episodes

Overview

Challenge One: "The Next YouTube Trend Challenge"
The first challenge was to create or start the next big YouTube trend. The guest judges were Wong Fu Productions, consisting of Wesley Chan, Ted Fu and Philip Wang.

Challenge Two: "The Vlog/Ugly Truth Challenge"
The second challenge was to create a video in which a question is posed to the audience about which of two or more (possibly dubious) truths is uglier. The guest judge was Phillip DeFranco.

Challenge Three: "The How-To Challenge"
The third challenge is to teach a skill to the audience in a smart, creative way. The guest judge was Kassem Gharaibeh, better known as KassemG.

Challenge Four: "The Chase Sequence Challenge"
The fourth challenge was to create an action-packed chase sequence in honor of the release Fast & Furious 6. The guest judges were Ben and Rafi Fine.

Challenge Five: "The Murder Mystery Challenge"
The fifth challenge was to use a list of poisons and sets to create a short murder mystery film. The guest judge was Shane Dawson.

Challenge Six: "The Prop Challenge"
The sixth challenge was to create a video that had to contain all of the following props:, a half stick of butter, 27 marbles, a big bouncy inflatable green ball, a helmet, two swords, and a famous crawling baby. Halfway through the challenge, another prop was added; a red cape and hood. None of the other usual props from the "Iconography Room" were allowed. The guest judge is Justine Ezarik, better known as iJustine. The second part of this episode received negative reactions from viewers, quickly garnering more "dislikes" than "likes" on the video, due to the elimination of Joule Thief, something which Goyette spoke about in his Q&A presented by The YOMYOMF Network.

Challenge Seven: "The Trailer Challenge"
The seventh challenge is to create an original movie trailer for a movie, television show, or anything, as long it is original. This is the final challenge before the Final 3 are selected. The guest mentor is Kevin Wu, better known as KevJumba. The guest judges are Jenna Mourey (better known as Jenna Marbles), Ian Hecox and Anthony Padilla (better known collectively as Smosh), and Felix Kjellberg, better known as PewDiePie.

"Finale"
The eighth and final challenge was to make any video that the contestants wished as a good representation of what their channel and personalities are like. They could use any location they would like, and had to finish the video within a week. Unlike the finale of the first season, where only two contestants advanced, three contestants advanced to the finale in the second season.

The finale was broadcast live on the YOMYOMF YouTube channel on 27 July 2013, from YouTube Space, Los Angeles, where Matthias was crowned the winner in front of a live audience.

Elimination Chart

Notes

References

Internet Icon
Web game shows
American non-fiction web series